Lancken is a railway station in the town of Sassnitz, Mecklenburg-Vorpommern, Germany. The station lies on the Stralsund-Sassnitz railway and the train services are operated by Ostdeutsche Eisenbahn GmbH.

Train services
The station is served by the following service(s):

Regional services  Rostock - Velgast - Stralsund - Lietzow - Sassnitz / Ostseebad Binz

References

External links
ODEG startet Fahrplanbetrieb auf RE9/RE10 mit geliehenen ÖBB-Fahrzeugen

Sassnitz
Railway stations in Mecklenburg-Western Pomerania
Buildings and structures in Vorpommern-Rügen
Railway stations in Germany opened in 1891